Sunny Slopes is an unincorporated community and census-designated place (CDP) in Mono County, California, United States. As of the 2020 census, the population was 139, down from 182 in 2010.

Geography
The CDP is in southern Mono County, on the north side of U.S. Route 395, which leads northwest  to Mammoth Lakes and southeast  to Bishop. More than half of the community is within Inyo National Forest.

Demographics
The 2010 United States Census reported that Sunny Slopes had a population of 182. The racial makeup of Sunny Slopes was 159 (87.4%) White, 0 (0.0%) African American, 2 (1.1%) Native American, 7 (3.8%) Asian, 4 (2.2%) Pacific Islander, 0 (0.0%) from other races, and 10 (5.5%) from two or more races. Hispanic or Latino of any race were 3 persons (1.6%).

The Census reported that 182 people (100% of the population) lived in households, 0 (0%) lived in non-institutionalized group quarters, and 0 (0%) were institutionalized.

There were 85 households, out of which 21 (24.7%) had children under the age of 18 living in them, 47 (55.3%) were opposite-sex married couples living together, 2 (2.4%) had a female householder with no husband present, 0 (0%) had a male householder with no wife present.  There were 4 (4.7%) unmarried opposite-sex partnerships, and 2 (2.4%) same-sex married couples or partnerships. 28 households (32.9%) were made up of individuals, and 11 (12.9%) had someone living alone who was 65 years of age or older. The average household size was 2.14.  There were 49 families (57.6% of all households); the average family size was 2.82.

The population was spread out, with 28 people (15.4%) under the age of 18, 6 people (3.3%) aged 18 to 24, 44 people (24.2%) aged 25 to 44, 84 people (46.2%) aged 45 to 64, and 20 people (11.0%) who were 65 years of age or older.  The median age was 47.2 years. For every 100 females, there were 91.6 males.  For every 100 females age 18 and over, there were 87.8 males.

The homeowner vacancy rate was 0%; the rental vacancy rate was 0%.  136 people (74.7% of the population) lived in owner-occupied housing units and 46 people (25.3%) lived in rental housing units.

References

Census-designated places in Mono County, California
Census-designated places in California